Miles (also known as Miles Store) is an unincorporated community in Mathews County, Virginia, United States. Miles had a post office, which closed on July 4, 1992.

References

Unincorporated communities in Mathews County, Virginia
Unincorporated communities in Virginia